Tall lettuce is a common name for several plants related to lettuce (Lactuca sativa) and may refer to:

 Lactuca virosa, native to Europe and Asia, introduced to North America
 Lactuca canadensis, native to North America